Derna may refer to:


Places
 Derna District, a district in eastern Libya
 Derna, Libya, a port city in that district
 Apostolic Vicariate of Derna, a Catholic pre-diocesan jurisdiction with see in that city 
 Derna, Bihor, Romania, a commune
 Derna mine
 Derna oil field
 Derna (river), Romania
 Derna Province, a province of Libya established in 1937 under Italian rule

Military
 Battle of Derna (disambiguation)
 RAF Derna, a former Royal Air Force station located near Derna, Libya, during the Second World War

People
 Derna Casetti (born 1959), Italian former female middle-distance and cross-country runner
 Derna Polazzo (1912–?), Italian sprinter and long jumper

See also
 Darneh (disambiguation)